Sandborg is a Swedish surname. Notable people with the surname include:

Amanda Sandborg Waesterberg (1842–1918), Swedish composer
Gunnar Sandborg  (1927–2022), Norwegian rower
Olof Sandborg (1884–1965), Swedish stage and film actor
Stefan Sandborg (born 1970), Swedish Army major general

Swedish-language surnames